The Yamaha CS1x is a sample-based synthesizer released by the Yamaha Corporation in 1996.

Aimed primarily at dance musicians, the CS1x features analogue synthesizer-emulating rotary controllers and monotimbral analogue synthesizer voices.The CS1x was succeeded in 1999 by the CS2x synthesizer.

Features 
The CS1x uses the Yamaha Sample and Synthesis technology, as well as General MIDI and XG voices from the MU-50 module.

Effects and functions 
The CS1x employs various arpeggiator presets and effects such as reverb, chorus (including flanging and celeste) and "variation" (a combination of reverbs, delays, modulation effects and equalisation).

Notable users 
 Underworld
 Jamiroquai
 David Bowie
 Boards of Canada
 Dave Greenfield
 Somatic Responses
 Skylab2000
 KOSmusic

Sequencer
The Yamaha CS1x can be expanded with a small sequencer workstation module. The CS1x, CS2x and AN1x synthesizers all have a small lip on the right hand end of the front panel to accommodate a QY or SU sized module.

References

Further reading

External links 
 CS1x-CS2x information, audio demo and manual

 CS1x information, manuals from the official Yamaha USA website

CS1x
Polyphonic synthesizers

Digital synthesizers